2008–09 was the 10th season that Division 1 functioned as the third-level of ice hockey in Sweden, below the second-level HockeyAllsvenskan and the top-level Elitserien (now the SHL).

Format 
The 55 participating teams played the first half of the season in six groups divided geographically. The successful teams then moved into three new groups (the Allettan groups), while the remaining teams played in a continuation of their smaller existing groups. The teams with the worst records in these continuation groups were then forced to defend their places in Division 1 against challengers from Division 2 (see "relegation tournament" below) in a round-robin tournament called Kvalserien till Division 1. Meanwhile, the successful teams from the Allettan groups along with the group winners of the continuation groups played a playoff to determine who would have a chance to compete for promotion to the second-tier league HockeyAllsvenskan in Kvalserien till HockeyAllsvenskan.

First round

Division 1A

Division 1B

Division 1C

Division 1D

Division 1E

Division 1F

AllEttan

Northern Group (A/B)

Central Group (C/D)

Southern Group (E/F)

Qualification round

Division 1A continuation

Division 1B continuation

Division 1C continuation

Division 1D continuation

Division 1E continuation

Division 1F continuation

Playoffs

First round 
 Clemensnäs HC - Hudiksvalls HC 1:2 (3:7, 3:2, 2:4)
 Botkyrka HC - Borlänge HF 0:2 (5:6 OT, 4:5)
 Karlskrona HK - Mjölby HC 2:0 (7:3, 1:0)

Second round 
 Hudiksvalls HC - Piteå HC 0:2 (0:1, 1:8)
 Borlänge HF - Nyköpings HK 0:2 (1:4, 4:5 OT)
 Karlskrona HK - Skåre BK 0:2 (3:5, 5:7)

Final round 
 Piteå HC - Asplöven HC 1:2 (3:2, 1:4, 1:4)
 Nyköpings HK - Tingsryds AIF 0:2 (1:4, 2:8)
 Enköpings SK - Örebro HK 0:2 (1:4, 2:5)
 Skåre BK - Valbo HC 1:2 (4:3 OT, 2:6, 0:2)

Relegation

Division 1A

Division 1B

Division 1C

Division 1D

Division 1E

Division 1F

External links 
 Season on hockeyarchives.info

3
Swedish Division I seasons